The 2011 Players Tour Championship Grand Final (officially the 2011 PartyCasino.com Players Tour Championship Finals for sponsorship purposes) was a professional ranking snooker tournament that took place between 16 and 20 March 2011 at The Helix in Dublin, Republic of Ireland. The tournament was broadcast by Eurosport.

Shaun Murphy won his fourth ranking title by defeating Martin Gould 4–0 in the final.

Prize fund and ranking points
The breakdown of prize money and ranking points of the event is shown below:

Seeding list
The leading 24 players in the PTC Order of Merit qualified for the event, provided that they had played in at least 6 events (3 in the UK and 3 in Europe). John Higgins and Ding Junhui were in the top 24 but failed to play in the minimum number of events.

Main draw

Final

Century breaks
  
 143, 111  Mark Williams
 133  Anthony Hamilton
 128  Andrew Higginson
 126  Marcus Campbell
 116  Shaun Murphy
 113  Judd Trump
 110, 102  Michael Holt
 106, 100  Martin Gould
 103, 100  Stephen Lee

References

2011
Finals
2011 in Irish sport
Snooker competitions in Ireland
Snooker